s.Oliver Würzburg (formerly known as s.Oliver Baskets) is a German professional basketball club located in Würzburg, Germany. After one year of absence from the Basketball Bundesliga (BBL), the club has returned to first division German basketball in the 2015–16 season.

It was founded in 2007 with the aim to substitute the original club of the city, who was known as DJK Würzburg, which stood for "Deutsche Jugendkraft" (German youth power), and was affiliated to the DJK-Sportverband (Sport Association), which is affiliated with the Roman Catholic Church in Germany. The club has gained fame through its basketball department, in which NBA players Dirk Nowitzki and Maxi Kleber got their starts.

History

The old DJK Würzburg

The DJK Sport Association was founded on 16 September 1920 in Würzburg. Due to the geographic location of its home office, the DJK soon founded a local club in Würzburg. However, the different athletic departments found themselves divided among various Catholic clubs. During the Third Reich, all DJK affiliates were banned by the government. After World War II, the DJK consolidated all of its local departments into DJK Würzburg. Today the club has over 3000 members, including a variety of non-Catholic members.

The club's top women's handball team played in the Handball-Bundesliga Frauen, the top flight of women's handball in Germany, from 1976 to 1985, during the 1987–88 season and from 1993 to 1995.

The club's basketball department gained fame in the 1990s as both the men's and women's teams qualified for the top German Basketball Bundesliga (BBL) division. The women's team played many years in the first and second divisions and was crowned German Champion in 1993. In 1989, the men's team made the jump into the second division. In 1997, featuring Dirk Nowitzki in the line-up, DJK Würzburg claimed the 2nd Division South title, qualifying for the Basketball Bundesliga. In 2001, DJK spun off its men's basketball team into a private corporate entity, now known as the Würzburg Baskets, to capitalize on their growth as a professional basketball team. DJK Würzburg has produced numerous players who have gone on to have success in the BBL, with the senior men's German national basketball team and, for Nowitzki, the NBA.

In 2005, the club resigned its spot in the BBL and the club stopped competing.

The current club
In 2007, American businessman Jochen Bähr acquired a license in the Regional league for a new team in Würzburg with the aim to reach the Pro A in few seasons.

In 2011, the Würzburg Baskets, now by the name of s.Oliver Baskets (after their new sponsor s.Oliver), gained promotion from the PRO A (German Second Division), and moved up to the Basketball Bundesliga (German First Division). In its first season back in the first division, in 2011–12, the team reached the German League semi-finals, after beating Alba Berlin by 3–1 in the quarterfinal series of the playoffs. In 2012–13 the actual club played in Europe for the first time, in the second tier Eurocup. In 2013–14 they relegated from the BBL. They immediately promoted back to the first tier in the 2014–15 season. The 2015–16 season was finished on rank 8, thus qualifying for the playoffs for the second time after 2012. In quarterfinals the team was eliminated by future league champion Brose Baskets, losing every game with at least a 35-point margin.

On 15 July 2016 the team changed their name from "s.Oliver Baskets" to "s.Oliver Würzburg" to strengthen the identification of team and city. Additionally the sponsoring contract with s.Oliver was extended through 2019.

In the 2018–19 season, Würzburg played in the FIBA Europe Cup. Würzburg reached the finals of the cup, its first European finals, in which it lost to Dinamo Sassari over two legs.

Honours
Numerous Bavarian amateur titles
Women's German Basketball Champions: 1993
Men's 2nd Division South Basketball Champions: 1997

European competitions
FIBA Europe Cup
Runners-up: 2018–19

Logos

Season by season

Team

Current roster

Depth chart

Notable players

To appear in this section a player must have played at least two seasons for the club AND either:
– Set a club record or won an individual award as a professional player.
– Played at least one official international match for his senior national team at any time.
 Dirk Nowitzki
 Robert Garrett
 Demond Greene
 Leon Kratzer
 Steven Hutchinson
 Maxi Kleber
 Craig Moller
 Olumide Oyedeji
 Justin Sears
 Luciano Parodi
 LaMonte Ulmer

Notable coaches
 Gordon Herbert (2000–2001)
 Dirk Bauermann (2017–2018)

Second team
Würzburg's second team plays in the ProB, the German third division.

Fan culture

Friendships
For many years, the fan-base of Würzburg has been connected, in a friendly way, with the supporters of the Baskets Bonn.

Rivalries
Within the Basketball Bundesliga, the city closest to Würzburg is Bamberg. Hence, between the Baskets Würzburg and the Baskets Bamberg, there has been an intense rivalry. Traditionally, the rivalry has been dominated by Bamberg because of its superior finances.

Kit manufacturer
2017: KIX

References

External links

Würzburg
Basketball clubs in Bavaria
2007 establishments in Germany
Basketball teams established in 2007